Anders Møller Christensen (born 26 July 1977) is a retired Danish footballer.

International career
Møller Christensen was called up for the league national team, which played a number of unofficial national team games in the United States, El Salvador and Honduras in January 2007, by national team manager Morten Olsen. Later in 2007, he was also called up as backup on the center-back position for the A national team, without getting his debut. This came, when the team had injury problems in 2008, and Anders Møller Christensen earned his cap in a friendly match against the Netherlands on 29 May.

References

External links
 FC Roskilde profile
 Danish national team profile
 Anders Møller Christensen on Soccerway

Living people
1977 births
Danish men's footballers
Denmark international footballers
Esbjerg fB players
Odense Boldklub players
FC Roskilde players
Danish Superliga players
Belgian Pro League players
Danish expatriate men's footballers
Expatriate footballers in Belgium
Association football defenders